Vukajlija is a popular Serbia-based web site very similar to Urban Dictionary in content. As such, the site mainly consists of often humorous definitions, observations and (not rarely vulgar) explanations of slang terms from a more local point of view that the one on Urban Dictionary.

The name Vukajlija is itself a word play on Vujaklija, the surname of Serbian linguist Milan Vujaklija whose most notable work is Lexicon of foreign words and terms, first published in 1937. Also, the similarity in names may have contributed to early popularity of the site, as a number of people searching for Vukajlija in error instead of Vujaklija reached the site.

External links
 Vukajlija

Serbian websites
Lexicography
Online dictionaries
Slang
Neologisms
Internet slang
Internet properties established in 2007
2007 establishments in Serbia